31 km is a rural locality (a passing loop) in Arlyukskoye Rural Settlement of Yurginsky District, Russia. The population was 70 as of 2010. There is 1 street.

Geography 
31 km is located 47 km south of Yurga (the district's administrative centre) by road. Lineyny is the nearest rural locality.

References 

Rural localities in Kemerovo Oblast